Disney's Comics in 3-D was a two-part comic book series published by Disney Comics in 1992.

Unlike most comic books, the stories are drawn in 3-D stereo. The first issue had Mickey Mouse, Donald Duck, Uncle Scrooge, and Duck Tales, and the second issue had all Roger Rabbit stories.

List of stories

Issue 1
Donald Duck in Knights of the Flying Sleds by Carl Barks (Reprinted from Walt Disney's Comics and Stories #223)
Duck Tales in The Billion Bean Stampede by William Van Horn (Reprinted from Duck Tales #13 "The Gladstone Series")
Mickey Mouse center spread by Floyd Gottfredson (Reprinted from King Features Syndicate on April 30, 1933)
Uncle Scrooge in The Curse of Nostrildamus by Don Rosa (Reprinted from Uncle Scrooge #235)
Donald Duck in Rocket Wing Saves the Day by Carl Barks (Reprinted from Walt Disney's Comics and Stories #139)

Issue 2
Roger Rabbit in Gym Dandy (Reprinted from Roger Rabbit #2)
Roger Rabbit in The Candy Cane Mutiny (Reprinted from Roger Rabbit #6)
Roger Rabbit in Movin to the Music (Reprinted from Roger Rabbit #11)
Roger Rabbit in Cotton Tailspin (Reprinted from Roger Rabbit #4)

3-D comics were later used for issues of Disney Adventures Magazine which were used in the early to mid-1990s.

External links

Disney Comics titles
Disney comics titles
Stereoscopy